Orestes Pursued by the Furies is an event from Greek mythology that is a recurring theme in art depicting Orestes.

Background
In the Iliad, the king of Argos, Agamemnon, sacrifices his daughter Iphigenia to Artemis to assure good sailing weather to travel to Troy and fight in the Trojan War. In Agamemnon, the first play of Aeschylus's Oresteia trilogy, Agamemnon's wife, Clytemnestra, and her lover, Aegisthus, murder Agamemnon upon his return home as revenge for sacrificing Iphigenia. In The Libation Bearers, the second play of the Orestia, Agamemnon's son Orestes returns home to take revenge on his mother for murdering his father. Orestes ultimately does murder his mother, and afterward is tormented and chased offstage by The Furies, beings who personify vengeance.

In art
Orestes being tormented by the Furies has been depicted by a number of artists, including the following: 
 Orestes Pursued by the Furies, Louis Lafitte (1790), Ackland Art Museum, Chapel Hill, North Carolina 
 Orestes Pursued by the Furies, William-Adolphe Bouguereau (1862), Chrysler Museum of Art 
 Orestes Pursued by the Furies, Carl Rahl (1852), State Museum for Art and Cultural History 
 Orestes Pursued By The Furies, John Singer Sargent (1921), Museum of Fine Arts, Boston 
 Orestes and the Furies, Jacques Francois Ferdinand Lairesse ( 1850–1929) 
 Orestes Pursued by the Furies, Alexander Runciman ( 1736–1785), National Galleries of Scotland

References

Greek mythology
Iconography